Jana Bommersbach is an American writer.

Life and career
Bommersbach was born in Fargo, North Dakota. She studied and graduated from the University of North Dakota and the University of Michigan. In 1972, she moved to Arizona and started to work as a journalist.

In 2012, she worked on the Outrageous Arizona along with Marshall Trimble.

Bommersbach has worked for Phoenix New Times and the Arizona Republic.

Books
Funeral Hotdish
The Trunk Murderess: Winnie Ruth Judd
Cattle Kate: A Mystery

References

Living people
American writers
University of North Dakota alumni
Year of birth missing (living people)